Bishop Stepan Meniok, C.Ss.R. (born 19 August 1949 in Nakonechne, Yavoriv Raion, Lviv Oblast, Ukrainian SSR) is a Ukrainian Greek Catholic hierarch, who serves as an Archiepiscopal Exarch of Ukrainian Catholic Archiepiscopal Exarchate of Donetsk and a Titular Bishop of Acarassus since 11 January 2002.

Life
Bishop Meniok was born in the family of clandestine Greek-Catholics Petro Meniok. After graduation of the school education, he graduated the technical college #1 in Lviv and made a compulsory service in the Soviet Army during 1969–1971.

After this time he became a clandestine member of the Congregation of the Most Holy Redeemer, where he had a profession on 8 November 1975 and a solemn profession on 8 October 1981. Meniok was ordained as priest on 8 July 1984, after completed clandestine theological studies and worked as pastor among the faithful of the "Catacomb Church" in Belz and Kamianobrid until 1990. From 1990 he openly served as priest, missionary and founder of the new Greek-Catholic parishes after the Dissolution of the Soviet Union. During 1994–1998 he was a Rector of the Theological Seminary in Lviv and after, during 1998–2002 as a Rector of the Ukrainian Redemptorists province Theological Seminary.

On 11 January 2002 Fr. Meniok was appointed and on 15 February 2002 was consecrated to the Episcopate as the first Archiepiscopal Exarch of the new created Ukrainian Catholic Archiepiscopal Exarchate of Donetsk-Kharkiv. The principal consecrator was Cardinal Lubomyr Husar, the Head of the Ukrainian Greek Catholic Church.

References

External links

1949 births
Living people
People from Lviv Oblast
Ukrainian Eastern Catholics
Bishops of the Ukrainian Greek Catholic Church
Redemptorists
Redemptorist bishops
21st-century Eastern Catholic bishops